The International Commission for Orders of Chivalry (ICOC; Italian: Commissione internazionale permanente per lo studio degli ordini cavallereschi) is a privately run, privately funded organisation composed of scholars on chivalric matters and systems of awards. Founded in 1960, its stated purpose is to examine orders of chivalry to determine their legitimacy. Its president since 1999 is Pier Felice degli Uberti, and its seat is situated in Milan, Italy.

During the Congress of Madrid (1955), Vicente de Cadenas y Vicent thought that it was appropriate to create a commission of scholars on chivalric matters. This idea was instituted during the 5th International Congress of Genealogical and Heraldic Sciences in Stockholm, Sweden, under the protection of Swedish Prince Bertil, Duke of Halland (with State Herald of Sweden Gunnar Scheffer as General Secretary), by decision of the Commission for State Heraldry chaired by Alessandro Monti della Corte with the purpose of creating a provisional list of orders whose approval had to be submitted to the next Congress.

Initially, notably in 1964–1999, the organisation was embroiled in several controversies caused by the different cultural training of its commissioners. The root of some of these controversies stems from the unavoidable bias inherent in the ICOC's governing structure as a private, non-governmental organization. The Commission as a private body lacks any legal jurisdiction to unilaterally declare anything other than what amounts to a private opinion.

Since its foundation, it has had a number of patrons, with honorary function without the right to vote, notably including Archduke Otto von Habsburg, Cardinal Pio Laghi, Patron Cardinal of the Sovereign Military Order of Malta, Cardinal Giuseppe Caprio, Grand Master emeritus of the Order of the Holy Sepulchre, and Maria Vladimirovna, Grand Duchess of Russia, among others.

To avoid any conflict of interest, the commissioners who hold important offices in a particular order of chivalry cannot participate in the decision regarding that order. The ICOC's most recent Register and Provisional List of Orders was published in 2016.

History

Formation and early history 
The International Commission for Orders of Chivalry (ICOC) was founded at the fifth International Congress of Genealogical and Heraldic Sciences in Stockholm, Sweden, under the protection of Swedish Prince Bertil, Duke of Halland, with State Herald of Sweden Gunnar Scheffer as General Secretary. The International Congress of Genealogical and Heraldic Sciences is a biennial convention for genealogists, heraldic scholars and others working in related fields. The Congress that year was under the leadership of the Swedish Baron Hamilton of Hageby.

The reason for its foundation is explained in a report of the "Commission for State Heraldry" – composed of: Baron Alessandro Monti della Corte, President, who was also the Chancellor of the Order of Saints Maurice and Lazarus; Hungarian author Noble professor Gèza Grosschmid Zsögöd de Visegrad, Vice President; 
Roger Harmignies, Rapporteur; and by its Members: Portcullis Pursuivant John Brooke-Little; Lt. Col. Robert Gayre, a Scottish anthropologist and author who had an interest in heraldry; Robert Matagne; genealogist and officer of arms Sir Iain Moncreiffe of that Ilk, Bt., Baron of Easter Moncreiffe; Elisabeth Prins;
Officer of Arms Conrad Swan and Paul Warming – concerning point 4, "the decisions of the III Congress at Madrid (1955)
were recalled relative to the juridical and historical conditions which had to apply to independent, both Dynastic and Family, Orders of Chivalry and it was recommended to prepare a list, albeit provisional, of the said Orders so that they might be studied and then approved at the following congress.".

The purpose of the ICOC was originally to determine the legitimacy of orders of chivalry as, since the late 19th century, a number of purported orders had been operating, bestowing (and often selling) chivalric and noble titles. It was believed that an organisation like the ICOC, while not possessing any actual powers of enforcement, could research the relative legitimacy of claimed orders and provide the public with objective information about the orders to enable them to choose legitimate ones.

Initial controversy (1964–1999) 
The first Register (1964) was published with the agreement of all the commissioners, but a second one was published without their authorization by Robert Gayre, who included the Order of Saint Lazarus (statuted 1910) in the list, and many of the other members of the board of directors resigned in protest. Gayre replaced them with members of the Order of Saint Lazarus, and those sympathetic to their goal to be recognized as a legitimate chivalric order.

During the period 1964–98, there were meetings held in 1964 (The Hague), 1966 (Paris), 1967 (Brussels), 1970 (Vienna and Munich), 1984 (Washington); later and until 1996, there were only private meetings between commissioners in the house of Robert Gayre.

In 1970, the ICOC decided also to approve the "Order of Saint John of Jerusalem, Knights Hospitaller (or "Royal Yugoslavian Order of Saint John"), a move that further alienated the ICOC from the company of respectable scholarship and increasingly cast suspicion on their own validity.

By 1996, the last year of Robert Gayre's presidency, the Vice-President of the ICOC was Terence Francis MacCarthy. On 28 January 1992, the Irish Genealogical Office conferred courtesy Chief of the Name recognition to Terence MacCarthy as the MacCarthy Mór, the title of the chief of the MacCarthy sept or clan. This recognition by the prestigious Irish Genealogical Office allowed him to gain credibility in nobiliary circles in the world, so it was easy for him to be the founder of the self-styled Irish chivalric Order the Niadh Nask, and to fraudulently claim to be "Prince of Desmond" the MacCarthy Mòr. 
Robert Gayre himself had assumed the fantasy title of "Baron of Lochoreshire", and claimed to be the chief of the Clan Gayre, which he had earlier invented. 
However, the Lord Lyon King of Arms recognized Robert Gayre as Gayre of Gayre and Nigg, Chief of the Name and Arms of Gayre, and Baron of Lochoreshire, as published in Burke's Peerage, Baronetage and Knightage. 
Gayre served as MacCarthy's "Constable" in the Niadh Nask. The other eight members of the board of the ICOC in 1996 included Patrick O'Kelly, who claimed to be "Baron O'Kelly de Conejera", and six other members of the Niadh Nask.

Since the Niadh Nask was heretofore unknown within the world of chivalric orders, Robert Gayre and the ICOC expanded the original focus of the group to include a new category, called "Dynastic Nobiliary Fraternities". Hundreds of people, taken in by these claims, joined the Niadh Nask or donated to their "cause", totaling about $1 million. Among those convinced by the hoax were former Irish Prime Ministers Charles Haughey, Albert Reynolds, and John Brooke-Little. After Gayre's death in 1996, Terence Francis MacCarthy assumed the position of President and continued using the ICOC as a vehicle to advance his fraudulent nobiliary claims. In July 1999, the falsity of Terence Francis MacCarthy's claims was discovered and reported in the media, and he resigned from the ICOC.

During this period, these Registers were published: 1964 (2nd edition), without the permission of the president Baron Alessandro Monti della Corte, the event that caused his resignation; 1970; 1978, issued under the presidency of H.S.H. Prince Ernst August of Lippe; 1996, issued under the presidency of Robert Gayre; and 1998, issued under the presidency of Terence Francis MacCarthy.

Consolidation since 1999 
Since 1999, the President of the ICOC has been Pier Felice degli Uberti, who immediately decided to admit the errors of the past, although these happened without his own fault:

In 1999, the ICOC also decided to remove the Order of Saint Lazarus (statuted 1910) from the Register's list of legitimate orders of chivalry.

The purpose was to return to the initial mission of the ICOC commission born in the congresses and the only one which was authorized by Paul Adam, president of AIH, to continue its complex work also at the end of the Congress (1962) remaining as a Permanent Commission. Pier Felice degli Uberti's first act was to ask all the commissioners their curriculum vitae, removing those whose academic standing was not sufficient to the position of commissioner; abolished all the precedent Registers bringing into force the first edition of 1964 Register and deleting the questionable orders in time inserted.
The previous board membership was replaced largely by individuals of greater credibility in the heraldry and chivalric orders community, such as author and nobiliary expert Guy Stair Sainty, genealogical and heraldic expert as Roger Harmignies, Cecil Humphery-Smith, Michel Popoff, Henrik Klackenberg, Elizabeth Roads, President of International Academy of Heraldry – AIH, Hervé Pinoteau, Peter Kurrild-Klitgaard, Robert Watt, Past President of International Academy of Heraldry – AIH, Maria Loredana Pinotti, President of International Academy of Genealogy – AIG, Michel Teillard d'Eyry, Past President of International Academy of Genealogy – AIG as well as historian of the crusades Jonathan Riley-Smith.

Starting from 2002, the ICOC began to hold its General Assemblies within the international colloquia of the International Academies of Heraldry – AIH and Genealogy – AIG and, from 2010, within the International Congresses of Heraldic and Genealogical Sciences (as was the case when the Commission was founded).

As suggested by the Executive Committee, the International Commission for Orders of Chivalry Prize was founded within the Prizes and Awards Commission of the Confédération Internationale de Généalogie et d’Héraldique, to be conferred on a publication about chivalry and awards, starting from the XXVIII International Congress of Genealogical and Heraldic Sciences of Quebec City (2008).  
 The 1st 2008 edition was awarded to Guy Stair Sainty and Rafal ("Rafe") Heydel-Mankoo for their publication "World Orders of Knighthood and Merit" (2006). 
 The 2nd 2010 edition was granted to D’Arcy Jonathan Dacre Boulton, PhD, for his publication "The Knights of the Crown: The Monarchical Orders of Knighthood in Later Medieval Europe, 1325–1520" (1987).
 The 3rd 2012 edition was awarded to Prof. Peter Kurrild Klitgaard, PhD, for his publication "Knights of Fantasy: Self-styled ‘Orders’ called ‘of Saint John’ or ‘of Malta’ in the Nordic countries. Revised edition of: Knights of Fantasy" (2012 [2002]). 
 The 4th 2014 edition was awarded to Col. Fulvio Poli, for his publication "Outremer Storia Militare delle Crociate in Terrasanta" (2014), and an extraordinary edition of the Prize was awarded to Prof. Jonathan Riley-Smith, GCStJ, FRHistS, for his publication "Hospitallers: The History of Order of St. John". (2013 [1999]). 
 The 5th 2016 edition was granted to Rev. Prof. P J Galloway, OBE, JP, FSA for his works: "The Order of the Thistle" (2009), "Order of St Patrick" (1983 and 1999), "Order of the Bath" (2006), "Order of St Michael and St George" (2000), "The Royal Victorian Order" (1996), "Order of the British Empire" (1996) and "The Companions of Honour" (2002).

In 2015, the ICOC decided to consider as Knightly Orders to be included in the Register only those historical, while the other classifications should be deemed as appendices in order to inform of their existence, but without going about their evaluation. In addition all the new creations, currently being made by heads of once ruling houses, should be simply considered as awarding systems without chivalric content.

Publications
In 1964, the ICOC expanded their original focus by adding a new category which they called "Noble Corporations". They expanded further in 1984 with "Other Noble Corporations", in 1998 with "Ecclesiastical Decorations", in 2000 with "Bodies of a Chivalric Character" and "Bodies inspired by chivalry", in 2001 with "Bodies which referred to Orders or awards which had been awarded by state bodies in the past" and again in 2002 with "Revivals of ancient chivalric institutions founded as Orders by the dynastic successor of the founding authority; New chivalric institutions founded by the head of a former reigning dynasty; Successors of chivalric institutions founded under the authority of a state".

The ICOC's most recent Register and Provisional List of Orders was published in 2016.

Patrons
Notable patrons have included:

Royal or Imperial
 Philipp Albrecht, Duke of Württemberg (1893–1975)
 Archduke Otto of Austria (1912–2011)
 Archduke Hubert Salvator of Austria
 Archduke Joseph Árpád of Austria (1935–2017)
 Countess Walburga Habsburg Douglas, née Archduchess Walburga Maria of Austria
 Duarte Pio, Duke of Braganza
 Maria Vladimirovna, Grand Duchess of Russia
 Prince Sergius of Yugoslavia
 Leka II, Crown Prince of Albania
 Archduke Joseph Karl Maria of Austria

Ecclesiastical
 Cardinal Giuseppe Caprio, Grand Master emeritus of the Equestrian Order of the Holy Sepulchre of Jerusalem and President emeritus of the Prefecture for the Economic Affairs of the Holy See (1914–2005)
 Cardinal Alfons Maria Stickler, SDB, Librarian and Archivist emeritus of the Holy Roman Church (1910–2007)
 Cardinal Pio Laghi, Patron Cardinal of Sovereign Military Order of Malta, Prefect emeritus of the Congregation for Catholic Education (association of seminars and educational institutes)(1922–2009)
 Cardinal Andrea Cordero Lanza di Montezemolo, Archpriest of Basilica of Saint Paul Outside the Walls (1925–2017)
 Patriarch Ignatius Joseph III Yonan of Syriac Catholic Church
 Bruno Platter, past Grand Master of the Teutonic Order

Commissioners
The current Commissioners of the organization are (as of February 2022):

 Alexandre Abramov (Decorations, Medals and other Awards of Patriarchate of Moscow)
 Francisco Acedo y Fernández (Chivalric Orders Iconography)
 Paolo Arfilli (Orders, Decorations, Medals and Awards of the Royal House of Savoy)
 Jonas Arnell-Szurkos (Orders, Decorations, Medals and Awards of the Kingdom of Sweden)
 Ádám Berniczei-Roykó (Orders, Decorations, Medals and Awards of Kingdom of Hungary)
 Alessio Butti (Orders, Decorations, Medals and Awards of Balkan Area)
 Giorgio Cuneo (ICOC-Cert certificates)
 D’Arcy Jonathan Dacre Boulton (Medieval Monarchical Orders)
 Luigi G. de Anna (Scandinavian Orders, Decorations, Medals and Awards)
 Emiddio de Franciscis di Casanova (Orders, Decorations, Medals and Awards of the Kingdom of the Two Sicilies)
 Nicola Ditta (Orders, Decorations, Medals and Awards of the Kingdom of Italy)
 Stanislaw W. Dumin (Orders, Decorations, Medals and other Awards of the Imperial House of Romanov)
 Marcos Fernández de Béthencourt (Order, Decorations, Medals and Awards of the Sovereign Military Hospitaller Order of St John of Jerusalem, of Rhodes and of Malta)
 Thomas Frasheri (Orders, Decorations, Medals and other Awards of the Royal House of Albania)
 Manuel Fuertes de Gilbert y Rojo (Orders, Decorations, Medals and Awards of the Royal House of Spain)
 Fernando Garcia-Mercadal y Garcia-Loygorry (Orders, Decorations, Medals and Awards of the Kingdom of Spain)
 Alberto Giovanelli (Orders, Decorations, Medals and Awards of the Royal House of Savoy)
 Rafal Heydel-Mankoo (Polish orders, decorations, medals and Awards)
 Marco Horak, Deputy chairman (Orders, Decorations, Medals and Awards of the Austro-Hungarian Empire)
 Jovan Jonovski (Orders, Decorations, Medals and Awards of the Republic of Macedonia)
 Henrik Klackenberg (Orders, Decorations, Medals and Awards of the Kingdom of Sweden)
 Manuel Ladrón de Guevara e Isasa (Noble Corporations and Associations of the Kingdom of Spain)
 Manfredi Landi (Orders, Decorations, Medals and Awards of the Ducal House of Parma)
 George Lucky (State Merit Orders of Mongolia and the former States of USSR excluding Russia, Belarus and Ukraine)
 Carlos Mack Castelletti (International law expert – legal advisor)
 Carlo Emanuele Manfredi (Orders, Decorations, Medals and Awards of the Ducal House of Parma)
 Sergei Mankov (Decorations, Medals and other Awards of the Orthodox Churches)
 Alfonso Marini Dettina (Orders, Decorations, Medals and Awards of the Royal House of the Two Sicilies)
 Per Nordenvall (Orders, Decorations, Medals and Awards of the Kingdom of Sweden)
 Salvatore Olivari de la Moneda (Decorations, Medals and other Awards of Patriarchate of Antioch and All the East of the Syrians)
 Manuel Pardo de Vera y Díaz (Noble Corporations and Associations of the Kingdom of Spain)
 Maria Loredana Pinotti, Secretary General (Orders, Decorations, Medals and Awards of the Republic of San Marino)
 Michel Popoff (Heraldry in chivalric orders and awarding systems)
 Elizabeth Ann Roads (Orders, Decorations, Medals and Awards of the United Kingdom)
 Bianca Maria Rusconi (Orders, Decorations, Medals and Awards of the Ducal House of Modena and Reggio)
 Guy Stair Sainty (Orders of St John, Members of the Alliance of the Orders of St John)
 Alberto Simione (Web Manager)
 Kaare Seeberg Sidselrud (Orders, Decorations, Medals and Awards of the Kingdom of Norway)
 Michel Teillard d’Eyry (Orders, Decorations, Medals and other Awards of the Republic of France)
 Tudor-Radu Tiron (Orders, Decorations, Medals and Awards of the Kingdom and Republic of Romania)
 Pier Felice degli Uberti, President/Chairman (Control of the whole Register)
 Diego de Vargas Machuca, Vice President (Noble Corporations of the Kingdom of Two Sicilies)
 George V. Vilinbakhov (Orders, Decorations, Medals and other Awards of the Russian Federation)
 Mario Volpe (Italian Law 178 of 3 March 1951, foundation of the Order of Merit of the Italian Republic and the other contents of that Law)
 Robert Watt, President International Academy of Heraldry – AIH (Heraldry in Canadian Orders, Decorations, Medals and Awards)
 George Way of Plean (Scottish Clans)
 Carlo Zanardi Landi (Orders, Decorations, Medals and Awards of the Ducal House of Lucca)

Consultor
The Consultor today are:

 Real Academia Matritense de Heráldica y Genealogía
 Ernesto Fernández-Xesta y Vázquez
 Instituto Español de Estudios Nobiliarios

References

External links 
 

Organizations established in 1960
Orders of chivalry
Legitimacy law